Redelinghuys is a surname. Notable people with the surname include:

Johnny Redelinghuys (born 1984), Namibian rugby union player
Julian Redelinghuys (born 1989), South African rugby union player
Marius Redelinghuys (born 1987), South African politician 
Marno Redelinghuys (born 1993), South African rugby union player